Thomas Woods (30 January 1890 – ?) was a Welsh-born dual-code international rugby union and rugby league footballer who played in the 1910s and 1920s. Woods was the first man to play international rugby union (RU) for England, and international rugby league (RL) for Wales.

Playing career

International honours
Thomas Woods won 5 caps for England (RU) in 1920–1921, and won 4 caps for Wales (RL) in 1921–1923 while at Wigan.

Championship final appearances
Thomas Woods played  in Wigan's 13-2 victory over Oldham in the Championship Final during the 1921–22 season at The Cliff, Broughton on Saturday 6 May 1922.

County Cup Final appearances
Thomas Woods played  in Wigan's 20–2 victory over Leigh in the 1922–23 Lancashire County Cup Final during the 1922–23 season at The Willows, Salford on Saturday 25 November 1922.

References

External links
Statistics at wigan.rlfans.com

1890 births
Devonport Services R.F.C. players
England international rugby union players
Place of death missing
Plymouth Albion R.F.C. players
Pontypool RFC players
Royal Navy rugby union players
Rugby league hookers
Rugby league players from Pontypool
Rugby league props
Rugby league second-rows
Rugby union forwards
Rugby union players from Pontypool
Wales national rugby league team players
Welsh rugby league players
Welsh rugby union players
Wigan Warriors players
Year of death missing